The Iloilo National High School (INHS), formerly the Iloilo High School is a Provincial Junior and Senior High School located in Iloilo City, Philippines. It was founded in 1902 under the American colonial government forming as an adjunction of the Philippine Normal School System with the  present day West Visayas State University (formally established 1924), it is the first public provincial high school in the Philippines established in the said regime.

It operates different Junior High School programs under its umbrella - School for the Arts, Strengthened Technical-Vocational Education Program (which was formerly known as School of the Future), Evening Opportunity Class, Regular Class, Special Program in Sports, Special Program in Journalism, Special Program for Students with Special Needs and the Special Science Class; while it also offers a Senior High School program.

Each program focuses on different students' aspect to help them develop their talents.

High schools in Iloilo
Schools in Iloilo City